Jimmy Verbaeys (Brussels, born August 26, 1993) is a Belgian gymnast.

Verbaeys represented his country at the 2012 Summer Olympics in London, during which he qualified for the individual all-around finals and finished in 21st position with a total score of 85.231 points.

Results

2012
 21st at the 2012 Summer Olympics in the men's artistic individual all-around finals (85.231 points)
 2nd in Belgian championship all-round (82,850 points)

2011
 67th at the 2011 World Artistic Gymnastics Championships all-round (82,832 points)
 37th at the 2011 European Artistic Gymnastics Championships all-round (79,650 points)
 33rd at the 2011 European Artistic Gymnastics Championships pommel horse (13,375 points)

2010
 93rd at the 2010 European Men's Artistic Gymnastics Championships all-round (81,006 points)
 5th at the 2010 European Men's Artistic Gymnastics Championships pommel horse (13.125 points)

References

Belgian male artistic gymnasts
Gymnasts at the 2012 Summer Olympics
Olympic gymnasts of Belgium
1993 births
Living people
Sportspeople from Brussels
People from Uccle
European Games competitors for Belgium
Gymnasts at the 2015 European Games
Gymnasts at the 2019 European Games